Roberto Battaglia (23 June 1909 – 25 April 1965) was an Italian fencer. He won a gold medal in the team épée event at the 1952 Summer Olympics.

References

1909 births
1965 deaths
Fencers from Milan
Italian male fencers
Olympic fencers of Italy
Fencers at the 1952 Summer Olympics
Olympic gold medalists for Italy
Olympic medalists in fencing
Medalists at the 1952 Summer Olympics